EIDD-1723, also known as EPRX-01723 or as progesterone 20E-[O-[(phosphonooxy)methyl]oxime] sodium salt, is a synthetic, water-soluble analogue of progesterone and a neurosteroid which was developed for the potential treatment of traumatic brain injury. It is a rapidly converted prodrug of EIDD-036 (EPRX-036; progesterone 20-oxime), which is considered to be the active form of the agent. Previous C3 and C20 oxime derivatives of progesterone, such as P1-185 (progesterone 3-O-(-valine)-E-oxime), were also developed and studied prior to EIDD-1723.

See also
 List of neurosteroids § Inhibitory > Synthetic > Pregnanes
 List of progestogen esters § Oximes of progesterone derivatives

References

Experimental drugs
Enones
Neuroprotective agents
Neurosteroids
Organic sodium salts
Phosphate esters
Pregnanes
Prodrugs
Steroid oximes